Pasmilgys is a village located in Kėdainiai district municipality, in Kaunas County, in central Lithuania. It is located by the Smilga river. The village had a population of 8 people as of the 2011 census.

There is Holocaust Jewish burial place in Pasmilgys, where 2,076 Jews from Kėdainiai, Šėta and Žeimiai were murdered.

Demography

References

Villages in Kaunas County
Kėdainiai District Municipality